Biga is a city in Çanakkale Province in the Marmara region of Turkey. It is the seat of Biga District. Its population is 57,125 (2021). The center of COMU Faculty of Economics and Administrative Sciences is in Biga.

History
Within the area of Biga (at Karabiga) is the site of the ancient city of Pegaea, also known as Pegae or Pegai (Πηγαί, "the Springs") until late Byzantine times (in Crusader sources it is also known as Spiga). Archaeologists have not yet established how far back the site has been occupied. In ancient times, Pegaea, located on the plain of Adrastea on the border between the Troad and Mysia, was sometimes included as part of one and sometimes the other. Since coming under Ottoman rule in 1364 it has been known as Biga. Under the Ottomans, it was the seat of a sanjak.

Tourism
Among the tourist sites in the district are the Ilıcabashı spa, Parion (Kemerd), Priapos (Karabiga castle)

International relations

Biga is twinned with:
 Xanthi, Greece (since 2000)

See also
 Biga Çayı

Gallery

References

External links

 Road map of Biga and environs
 Detailed map of Biga district of Çanakkale
 Various images of Biga, Çanakkale
 Various images of Karabiga in Biga, Çanakkale
 Information on Biga 

Populated places in Çanakkale Province
Biga District
Towns in Turkey